The Coupe de France 2002–03 was its 86th edition. It was won by AJ Auxerre.

The cup winner qualified for UEFA Cup.

Round of 16

Quarter-finals

Semi-finals

Final

Topscorer
Djibril Cissé (6 goals)

References

French federation
2002–03 Coupe de France at ScoreShelf.com

2002–03 domestic association football cups
2002–03 in French football
2002-03